The following persons are or were president of the Supreme Court of the Netherlands:

References 

Presidents of the Supreme Court of the Netherlands